Balked at the Altar is a 1908 American short comedy film directed by  D. W. Griffith. A print of the film survives in the film archive of the Library of Congress. The film was made by the American Mutoscope and Biograph Company when it and many other early film studios in America's first motion picture industry were based in Fort Lee, New Jersey at the beginning of the 20th century.

Cast
 Mabel Stoughton as Female Lead
 Linda Arvidson
 George Gebhardt
 D. W. Griffith
 Robert Harron
 Arthur V. Johnson
 Mack Sennett
 Harry Solter

See also
 List of American films of 1908
 1908 in film
 D. W. Griffith filmography

References

External links

Balked at the Altar available for free download at Internet Archive

1908 films
1908 comedy films
1908 short films
Silent American comedy films
American silent short films
American black-and-white films
Films directed by D. W. Griffith
Films shot in Fort Lee, New Jersey
Articles containing video clips
American comedy short films
1900s American films